Gerald Balfour may refer to:
 Gerald Balfour, 2nd Earl of Balfour (1853–1945), British Conservative politician
 Gerald Balfour, 4th Earl of Balfour (1925–2003), Scottish peer